Lugu Subdistrict (or Luvalley) is an urban subdistrict of Yuelu District in Changsha City, Hunan Province, China. Historically the former State-owned Dongfanghong Farm of Changsha was in the territory of today's Lugu Subdistrict. The subdistrict is home and the core area of Changsha High-Tech Industrial Development Zone, it is dubbed "Luvalley".

The subdistrict of Dongfanghong was reformed from part of Lugu Subidstrict on March 1, 2017. The subdistrict has 12 communities under its jurisdiction.

History
Lugu Subdistrict was formed by dividing four communities of the historic Dongfanghong Town in March, 2010. Yule District was formed in 1996, meanwhile the state-owned Dongfanghong Farm of the historic Suburb District was added to Yule District. The state-owned Dongfanghong Farm was reorganized to Dongfanghong Town in 2000. Heyeba village of Leifeng Subdistrict, Jinnan and Hualong villages of Huangjin Town of the historic Wangcheng County were also added to Yule District, the three villages became parts of Dongfanghong Town in 2006. The former Lugu Subdistrict and Dongfanghong Town were merged to reform the present Lugu Subdistrict on 19 November 2015. In 2016, the subdistrict is divided into 13 communities and three villages.

Dongfanghong Subdistrict was reformed from the former Lugu Subidstrict on March 1, 2017.

Subdivision
 Changfeng Community
 Changqing Community
 Dongtang Community
 Hexinyuan Community
 Jinxiu Community
 Juyuan Community
 Lufeng Community
 Lujing Community
 Luquan Community
 Luyuan Community
 Xiangyang Community
 Yannong Community

References

Subdistricts of Changsha
Yuelu District